This is a list of electoral results for the electoral district of Maree in Queensland state elections.

Members for Maree

Election results

Elections in the 1940s

Elections in the 1930s

 Preferences were not distributed.

 Preferences were not distributed.

Elections in the 1920s

Elections in the 1910s

 Preferences were not distributed.

References

Queensland state electoral results by district